Hannah Mary Peel (born 27 August 1985) is a British artist, music producer, Mercury Music Prize and Emmy-nominated composer and BBC Radio 3 broadcaster. Her solo music is primarily electronic, synthesiser-based and often includes classical scoring and sound design, with references to the links between science, nature and music. She has scored music for television, film, theatre and dance, including Game of Thrones: The Last Watch (a special documentary).

Apart from her solo work, Peel has worked with collaborators on projects including orchestrations and conducting for Paul Weller, an album with the poet Will Burns, and as a member of the psychogeography indie rock group The Magnetic North and the electronic music group John Foxx and the Maths.

She has released solo records on her own imprint label, My Own Pleasure Records, including Fir Wave, Awake But Always Dreaming and Mary Casio: Journey to Cassiopeia.

Early life

Peel was born in Craigavon, Northern Ireland, on 27 August 1985. When she was eight years old, her family moved to Barnsley in South Yorkshire. Her father was an amateur folk musician, and she joined him in musical gatherings, including holidays in County Donegal, Republic of Ireland. She enrolled in the Liverpool Institute for Performing Arts at age 18. There, she studied violin, trombone and piano.

Music career

Performer/orchestral arranger/session musician

In 2018, Peel met Paul Weller through producer and co-songwriter Gawain Erland Cooper. She arranged strings and woodwind for his 2018 album True Meanings. Following the release, Peel orchestrated and conducted a small orchestra for his 2019 live album Other Aspects: Live at the Royal Festival Hall which featured songs from True Meanings, The Jam, Style Council and Weller's solo material. She has also orchestrated his record, On Sunset and the album Fat Pop.

TV and film scores 
In 2013, Peel won a Royal Television Society Award for Best Title Music for "Chloe", which had been featured in the British television series Dates. The track was individually adapted and rescored for each episode of the series. In February 2014, Peel released the EP Fabricstate which includes "Chloe". The artwork for the EP was created by Karborn and designed by Jonathan Barnbrook.  

In 2016, Peel composed the music for Alzheimers Research UK's television and online Christmas campaign, entitled Santa Forgot, and made in collaboration with Aardman Animations.

In 2018, Peel composed the title music to the BBC drama The A List produced by Kindle Entertainment. She also wrote the title music and composed additional scores for the Channel 4/Netflix series Kiss Me First. 

In 2019, Peel scored her first feature-length film score to the documentary Game of Thrones: The Last Watch in which she was nominated for a Television Academy Emmy Award. 

In 2020, Peel scored the soundtrack to the BAFTA-nominated BBC 2 documentary Lee Miller: A Life on the Frontline.

In 2020, Peel scored the soundtrack for the Channel 5 drama The Deceived written by Lisa McGee.

Theatre and dance 
In 2012, Peel co-composed the music for the Sadler's Wells Theatre production Compass, working alongside filmmaker and visual artist Tal Rosner and collaborating with choreographers from the Sidi Larbi Cherkaoui Company, the Pina Bausch Company, and Jasmin Vardimon. In 2018, Peel was featured on BBC Radio 4 as part of their portrait series.

In 2018, Peel composed a score featuring synths, live percussion and drums for a new, theatrical adaptation of Brighton Rock by the Pilot Theatre Company. The production toured the UK between February and May 2018.  Also in that year, working primarily on music box, Peel created several hand-punched pieces of music for the score to TeZukA about the life of manga artist Osamu Tezuka by the choreographer and dancer Sidi Larbi Cherkaoui.

Radio presenter 
Since 2019, Peel has been a weekly presenter on the BBC Radio 3 show Night Tracks. In 2018, she was a featured guest Radio presenter for five weeks on BBC 6 Music, filling in for Elbow's Guy Garvey, she has also presented specialist music series for BBC Radio Ulster.

Discography

Albums

Solo 

 2011: The Broken Wave (Static Caravan)
 2016: Awake but Always Dreaming (My Own Pleasure)
 2017: Mary Casio: Journey to Cassiopeia (My Own Pleasure)
 2018: Particles in Space (My Own Pleasure)
 2019: Chalk Hill Blue (Rivertones)
 2019: Game Of Thrones: The Last Watch (HBO)
 2020: The Deceived (Silva Screen Records)
 2021: Fir Wave (My Own Pleasure)
 2022: The Midwich Cuckoos (Invada Records)

With The Magnetic North 

 2012: Orkney: Symphony of The Magnetic North (Full Time Hobby)
 2016: Prospect of Skelmersdale (Full Time Hobby)

With John Foxx and the Maths 

 2013: Rhapsody (Metamatic Records)
 2020: Howl (Metamatic Records)

With Philippe Cohen Solal and Mike Lindsay (Tunng) 

 2021: Outsider (Ya Basta! Records)

With Beyond the Wizards Sleeve 

 2016: The Soft Bounce (Phantasy)

Solo EPs

EPs 
with Philippe Cohen Solal and Mike Lindsay (Tunng) 
 2015: Henry J. Darger (Ya! Basta Records)

Performance / writing credits

Scores 
2011: TeZukA by Sidi Larbi Cherkaoui – several tracks using hand-punched music
2012: Compass (Sadler's Wells Theatre) – Full score
2012: Anna Karenina soundtrack – several tracks
2013: Dates – title music
2016: Santa Forgot – Alzheimer’s Research UK and Aardman Animations – Full score
2018: Brighton Rock - Pilot Theatre - Full live theatre score
2018: Ice Alive - National Geographic - Full score
2018: Kiss Me First – Channel 4 / Netflix – title music and additional scoring
2018: The A List – BBC – title music
2019: Game of Thrones: The Last Watch (TV Special Documentary) – Full score
2019: Cold War Letters - London Calling – BBC 4 - Full score
2020: Close - Irish National Opera - Score
2020: The Deceived – Channel 5 - Full score
2020: Lee Miller: Life On The Frontline – BBC 2 - Full score

References

External links

1985 births
British indie pop musicians
Women singers from Northern Ireland
Living people
Musicians from London
Musicians from County Armagh
Musicians from Yorkshire
People from Craigavon, County Armagh
Pop musicians from Northern Ireland
Alumni of the Liverpool Institute for Performing Arts
21st-century British women singers
British women in electronic music
Irish-language singers
John Foxx and the Maths members
The Magnetic North members